The Ambassador of the Kingdom of England to Denmark was the foremost diplomatic representative of the historic Kingdom of England in Denmark, also referred to as the Kingdoms of Denmark and Norway, before the creation of the Kingdom of Great Britain in 1707.

The position was not always a continuous or permanent one, and there was sometimes no diplomatic representation between the two countries.

Envoys Extraordinary of England

1655: Henry Wilmot, 1st Earl of Rochester
September 1664 to April 1666: Sir Gilbert Talbot, Special Envoy;
1671: Hon. Charles Bertie
1671–1672: Charles Stewart, 3rd Duke of Richmond
1681-1682: Robert Robartes, Viscount Bodmin
1685-1692 Robert Molesworth
1689: Thomas Fotherby Commissary and Plenipotentiary
1691: Charles Douglas Special Mission 
1692-1702 Hugh Greg Chargé d'Affaires until 1711, then Minister Resident
1693: Robert Sutton, 2nd Baron Lexinton
1699-1700: James Cressett
1702-1706 James Vernon the younger (d. 1756), son of James Vernon, Secretary of State

After the Union of England and Scotland
In 1707 the Kingdom of England became part of the new Kingdom of Great Britain. For missions from the Court of St James's after 1707, see List of ambassadors of Great Britain to Denmark.

References

Denmark
England